Devil's Lottery is a 1932 American pre-Code drama film directed by Sam Taylor and written by Guy Bolton. The film stars Elissa Landi, Victor McLaglen, Alexander Kirkland, Ralph Morgan, Paul Cavanagh and Barbara Weeks. The film was released on March 27, 1932, by Fox Film Corporation.

Plot
In England a group of sweepstakes winners are invited to a weekend party at a lavish country estate. Murder, heartbreak, and betrayal soon follow.

Cast        
Elissa Landi as Evelyn Beresford
Victor McLaglen as Jem Meech
Alexander Kirkland as Stephen Alden
Ralph Morgan as Captain Geoffrey Maitland
Paul Cavanagh as Major Hugo Beresford
Barbara Weeks as Joan Mather
Beryl Mercer as Mrs. Mary Ann Meech
Herbert Mundin as Trowbridge
Halliwell Hobbes as Lord Litchfield
Lumsden Hare as Inspector Avery

References

External links 
 
 

1932 films
Fox Film films
American drama films
1932 drama films
Films directed by Sam Taylor
American black-and-white films
Films set in England
1930s English-language films
1930s American films